Synchronous Idle (SYN) is the ASCII control character 22 (0x16), represented as  in caret notation.   In EBCDIC the corresponding character is 50 (0x32). Synchronous Idle is used in synchronous serial communication systems such as Teletype machines or IBM's Bisync protocol to provide a signal from which synchronous correction may be achieved between data terminal equipment. 

Because there is no START, STOP, or PARITY bits present in synchronous serial communication, it is necessary to establish character framing through recognition of consecutive SYN characters—typically three—at which point character sync can be assumed to begin with the first bit of the SYN characters and every seven bits thereafter.
The SYN character has the bit pattern 00010110 (EBCDIC 00110010), which has the property that it is distinct from any bit-wise rotation of itself. This helps bit-alignment of sequences of synchronous idles.

See also
C0 and C1 control codes
ASCII
EBCDIC
Syncword

References

Control characters